Ceratitis ovalis is a species of Tephritid or fruit flies in the family Tephritidae.

References 

Dacinae
Agricultural pest insects